Derek Newton (born November 16, 1987) is a former American football offensive tackle. He was drafted by the Houston Texans in the seventh round of the 2011 NFL Draft and played for the team until knee injuries halted his career in 2016. He also played for the New Orleans Saints. He played college football at Arkansas State, and Hinds Community College before that.

Early years
A native of Utica, Mississippi, Newton attended Hinds County Agricultural High School, where he was an All-Metro and All-District lineman as a senior, after playing only two years of high school football. He helped the team to a 10–0 regular-season record during senior season. However, Newton went unregarded by national recruiting services like Rivals.com and Scout.com. Despite drawing some interest from North Texas and Troy, he decided to attend Hinds Community College in Raymond, Mississippi (2006–2007).

College career
A two-star recruit coming out of junior college, Newton went on to Arkansas State, where he redshirted in 2008. He became a starter in 2009, earning Second-team All-Sun Belt Conference honors. In 2010, he earned First-team honors.

Professional career

Houston Texans
Projected as a fifth-round selection, Newton was ranked as the No. 16 offensive tackle available in the 2011 NFL Draft. Sports Illustrated described him as "a solid athlete and a terrific developmental prospect who could eventually break into a starting lineup". Newton was eventually selected 214th overall by the Houston Texans. He was the first offensive lineman to be drafted out of Arkansas State since Ray Brown in 1986.

During his rookie season, Newton appeared in 14 games as a backup to veteran right tackle Eric Winston. After Winston was cut following the 2011 NFL season, Newton competed with veteran Rashad Butler for the starting right tackle spot, eventually winning out.

After starting every game of the 2012 season, Newton injured his right knee during the Texans' win over the Detroit Lions on November 22. He was replaced in the starting line-up by Ryan Harris.
 
On March 7, 2015, Newton re-signed with the Texans to a five-year, $26.5 million contract.

On October 24, 2016, Newton went down with an injury in a Week 7 game against the Denver Broncos and was carted off the field with air casts attached to both legs. It was eventually revealed that both patellar tendons were torn, effectively ending his 2016 season.

On May 12, 2017, Newton was placed on Reserve/PUP as a result of his knee injuries suffered in 2016.

On April 12, 2018, the Texans released Newton.

New Orleans Saints
On December 11, 2018, Newton signed a two-year contract with the New Orleans Saints, two years after his devastating knee injuries. He was released on December 20, 2018, but was re-signed a week later. On May 22, 2019, Newton was released by the Saints.

References

External links
Houston Texans bio
Arkansas State Red Wolves football bio

1987 births
Living people
People from Utica, Mississippi
Players of American football from Mississippi
American football offensive tackles
Arkansas State Red Wolves football players
Hinds Eagles football players
Houston Texans players
New Orleans Saints players
Ed Block Courage Award recipients